Marykulam is a small village.himtet in Udumbanchola taluk in Idukki district of Kerala State, India. It comes under Ayyappancovil Panchayath with all the basic amenities including schools, church, hospitals, temple, mosque, public library, bus/public transport availability and more....

Schools:
Govt. L.P. School Mattukatta
Grace Garden Public School Mattukatta
Marian Public School Marykulam
St. Joseph's Nursery School Marykulam
St. Mary's H.S.S. Marykulam
St. Mary's High School Marykulam
St. Mary's L.P. School Marykulam
St. Mary's U.P. School Marykulam

Nearby locations:
Amavilasam 
Kattappana 
Kumali

References

Villages in Idukki district